Brachyrhabdus is a monotypic beetle genus in the family Cerambycidae described by Per Olof Christopher Aurivillius in 1917. Its only species, Brachyrhabdus bifasciatus,  was described by the same author.

References

Cyrtinini
Beetles described in 1917
Monotypic Cerambycidae genera